Sarah Ezekiel (born 1965) is an artist. She has ALS and uses technology to control a computer cursor and create her images.

Ezekiel studied art and art history and had begun her career as an artist using primarily pastels, watercolors, and acrylics. She was diagnosed with motor neuron disease in 2000. She had a young child and was expecting her second child at the time. She cannot speak or move her arms. She uses EyeGaze from assistive technology company Tobii Dynavox to paint with her eyes.

She is a Lifelites ambassador, facilitating fundraising for the organization that brings technological assistance to children in hospice care. She is also the co-chair of the Northwest London chapter of the MND Association.

Exhibits and public events 
Ezekiel's art has been shown internationally, including at The Royal Academy Schools and Katara Art Center in Qatar. In 2019, her works were among those exhibited by the MND Association at their 40th anniversary event. In 2016 Ezekiel spoke at a Parliamentary reception supporting hospice medical care. She was also awarded the Third Sector Volunteer of the Year Award at this event.

References 

1965 births
Living people
English contemporary artists
21st-century British women artists
Artists with disabilities
English people with disabilities